The Yerevan dialect or Īravān dialect is one of the dialects of the Azerbaijani language.

Classification 
According to the German philologist Gerhard Doerfer, the Yerevan dialect belongs to Southern group of Azerbaijani language, along with the Nakhichevan and Ordubad dialects. The Azerbaijani philologist Memmedaghi Shiraliyev also places it in the Southern group to which he also adds the Tabriz dialect.

Soviet philologist Ninel Hajiyeva has concurred with Shiraliyev.

Swedish philologist Lars Johanson and Azerbaijani philologist Elbrus Azizov do not mention the Yerevan dialect in their classification of Azerbaijani language dialects.

History 
According to Shiraliyev, the formation of the Yerevan dialect dates back to the 18th century when the Iranian Khanates of the Caucasus were formed in the areas of modern-day Armenia and Azerbaijan.

References 

Azerbaijani language dialects